Jakob Maslø Dunsby (born 13 March 2000) is a Norwegian professional footballer who plays for Egersunds IK, as a right winger.

References

2000 births
Living people
People from Nøtterøy
Norwegian footballers
Norwegian expatriate footballers
Norway youth international footballers
Association football wingers
HIFK Fotboll players
IF Fram Larvik players
Egersunds IK players
Veikkausliiga players
Norwegian Second Division players
Norwegian expatriate sportspeople in Finland
Expatriate footballers in Finland
Sportspeople from Vestfold og Telemark